Open Architecture Computing Environment (OACE) was a specification that aimed to provide a standards-based computing environment in order to decouple computing environment from software applications. 
It was proposed for the United States Department of Defense in 2004.

See also
 Open architecture
 Mission Data Interface

References 

Distributed computing architecture
United States Navy